Cyril Arthur Merry (20 January 1911 – 19 April 1964) was a cricketer who played for Trinidad and Tobago and West Indies.

Merry was a hard-hitting right-hand batsman and occasional bowler who had played only a handful of matches for Trinidad before he was picked for the 1933 West Indies tour of England. He was one of the more forceful batsmen in the side, and his 146 in the match against Warwickshire was made at more than a run a minute. But he was not a success in the Test matches: at Lord's in the first match he made 9 and 1; recalled for the third match at The Oval he scored 13 and 11.

An influential figure in Trinidad cricket over many years, Merry captained the Trinidad team in inter-colonial matches several times in the later 1930s, but never made another century or Test appearance. His bowling appears to have been used largely to change ends or break partnerships.

Merry was also captain of the Queen's Park Cricket Club in Port of Spain and later its secretary. He also served as secretary to the West Indies Cricket Board of Control and as Trinidad's representative on it, and he was manager of the 1951-52 West Indies team in Australia and New Zealand. He died of a heart attack.

References

External links
 

1911 births
1964 deaths
West Indies Test cricketers
Trinidad and Tobago cricketers
People from Tobago
Tobagonian cricketers